Angaria may refer to:

Places 
Angria, a region in Germany, sometimes called Angaria
Angaria, Jhalokhati, in Dhaja, Bangladesh
Angaria, Patuakhali, in Barisal, Bangladesh

Other uses
Angaria (Roman law), a postal system
Angaria (gastropod), a genus of molluscs

See also
Angary, aspect of laws of war
Angara (disambiguation)